Philip Spencer (January 28, 1823 – December 1, 1842), a midshipman aboard , was executed for mutiny without a court-martial. He was the son of John C. Spencer, Secretary of War in U.S. President John Tyler's administration, and the grandson of Ambrose Spencer, a New York politician and lawyer.

Background

Spencer was born in Canandaigua, New York. He was described as handsome, despite a "wandering eye" (possibly strabismus) which surgery was unable to correct. As a youth at Geneva College (now Hobart College), he was considered wild and uncontrollable despite displaying signs of high intelligence. His favorite reading matter was pirate stories.

After an abortive stay at Union College – where he was a founder of the Chi Psi Fraternity – Spencer ran away and signed on a whaler at Nantucket. His father located him and convinced him that if a life on the sea was what he wanted, to live it as "a gentleman"; i.e., as a commissioned officer.

As Secretary of War, it was easy for Spencer's father to procure his son a midshipman's commission. Spencer proved to be just as intractable as ever, assaulting a superior officer aboard  twice while under the influence of alcohol. He was allowed to resign rather than face court-martial, but due to his father's position in the Cabinet, his resignation was not accepted.

Aboard Somers, Spencer gained favor with the ratings – many of whom were boys – through his privileged access to tobacco and rum. He also exhibited an irreverent attitude toward the navy and his captain, Alexander Slidell Mackenzie. In November 1842, during the return home from a voyage to Liberia, suspicion arose that Spencer had formed a plan to seize Somers and sail her as a pirate ship. His friendship with crew members Samuel Cromwell and Elisha Small was cited as evidence, as both these men were rumored to have sailed aboard slavers in the past.

On November 26, Spencer was shackled and detained on Somers''' foredeck after a list of names was found in his razor case. The names had been written using Greek letters. The following day, Cromwell and Small were also detained on the foredeck. After a meeting of the ship's officers, all three men were hanged on the yardarm on December 1 (at ). Spencer was nearly 20 years old.

Court of Inquiry

When the brig returned to New York, the Secretary of the Navy convened a court of flag officers to investigate the matter. Following a month of testimony, on January 23, 1843, the court of inquiry exonerated the captain and his officers, ruling the hangings fully justified. Although the commander was exonerated, public opinion was against him. Mackenzie requested a court-martial for himself. The court martial acquitted him on a split vote.

Court of public opinion

The government accepted the court's decision, but the acquittal did not satisfy public concerns with the case. Many commentators, including James Fenimore Cooper, denounced the hangings as murder and criticized the Navy's handling of the matter as an example of what today could be called a "whitewash."

The circumstance of Spencer, Cromwell and Small's deaths is one reason the U.S. Navy stopped training boys at sea and founded the United States Naval Academy. The event on USS Somers may be the only mutiny on a warship in US Navy history. Philip Spencer and the USS Somers affair were almost certainly a model for much of the story Billy Budd'', by Herman Melville, who was the first cousin of Lieutenant Guert Gansevoort, an officer aboard the ship.

References

Further reading
  308p., illus.

External links

1823 births
1842 deaths
19th-century executions by the United States
19th-century executions of American people
Burials at sea
Chi Psi founders
Extrajudicial killings
People executed by the United States military by hanging
People executed for mutiny
People from Canandaigua, New York
Executed people from New York (state)
People who died at sea
Union College (New York) alumni
United States Navy officers
1842 crimes in the United States
Spencer family of New York